Drospirenone/estetrol, sold under the brand name Nextstellis, Drovelis, and Lydisilka, among others, is a fixed-dose combination medication containing drospirenone, a progestin, and estetrol, an estrogen, which is used as a combined birth control pill for the prevention of pregnancy in women. It is taken by mouth.

It was approved for medical use in Canada in March 2021, and in the United States in April 2021.

Medical uses
Drospirenone/estetrol is used as a combined birth control pill to prevent pregnancy in women.

Side effects
Estetrol-containing birth control pills, similarly to estradiol-containing birth control pills, may have a lower risk of venous thromboembolism (VTE) than ethinylestradiol-containing birth control pills based on studies of coagulation. However, it is likely that another decade will be required before post-marketing epidemiological studies of VTE incidence with these birth control pills are completed and able to confirm this.

Pharmacology

Pharmacodynamics
Drospirenone/estetrol has a much lower impact on liver protein synthesis, including of sex hormone-binding globulin, angiotensinogen, and coagulation factors, than does ethinylestradiol/drospirenone.

Society and culture

Legal status
Drospirenone/estetrol is approved for the use of hormonal contraception in the European Union, the United States, and Canada.

Brand names
Drospirenone/estetrol in sold under the brand names Nexstellis, Drovelis, and Lydisilka.

See also
 Birth control pill formulations
 List of combined sex-hormonal preparations § Estrogens and progestogens

References

External links
 
 
 
 

Combined oral contraceptives